Jeannet is a French surname. Notable people with the surname include:

Christophe Jeannet (born 1965), French footballer
Fabrice Jeannet (born 1980), French fencer
Frédéric-Yves Jeannet (born 1959), French-born Mexican writer
Jérôme Jeannet (born 1977), French fencer
Louis-François Jeannet (1768–1832), French general

See also
Saint-Jeannet (disambiguation)

French-language surnames